(Dates in italics indicate de facto continuation of office)

Ancien regime and First Republic (1635-1794)

British occupation (1794–1814)

Restoration, Second Republic, Second Empire  (1814–70)

Third Republic (1870–1940)

Fourth and Fifth Republics (1945-present)

See also
Martinique
Politics of Martinique

External links
World Statesmen - Martinique

References

Martinique
Colonial and Departmental Heads
Prefects of Martinique